Burlya is a rural locality (a settlement) in Pribaykalsky District, Republic of Buryatia, Russia. The population was 43 as of 2010.

Geography 
Burlya is located 37 km north of Turuntayevo (the district's administrative centre) by road. Baturino is the nearest rural locality.

References 

Rural localities in Okinsky District